2022 Tipsport liga is the twenty-fifth edition of the annual football tournament in Czech Republic. Also, in Malta was the second edition of Tipsport Malta Cup.

Groups

Group A

Group B

Group C

Group D

Group E

2022 Tipsport Malta Cup

References

2021–22 in Czech football
2021–22 in Slovak football
2021–22 in Maltese football